Yangkok Rural LLG is a local-level government (LLG) of Sandaun Province, Papua New Guinea. Various Torricelli languages are spoken in the LLG.

Wards
01. Ausin/Yumoun
02. Mupun/Sikel
03. Weikint/Nunsi
04. Yuwil/Yemlu
05. Laingim/Soloku
06. Wulukum
07. Piom/Lalwi
08. Bimon/Maibel
09. Yili/Tomoum
10. Pinkil/Bairap
11. Warin/Witaili
12. Puang/Witikin
13. Weis/Witwan
14. Tomontonik/Yemnu
15. Anguganak
16. Rawot
17. Maimbel
18. Brugap/Bogasip
19. Yangkok
21. Mushu/Wublakil
22. Ningil 1 (Ningil language speakers)
23. Ningil 2 (Ningil language speakers)

References

Local-level governments of Sandaun Province